Farida Haddouche (born 1959 in Algiers) is a female politician in Algeria; she is Secretary General of the Front Party of National Liberation.

External links
 Représentation des femmes à l'Assemblée

1959 births
Living people
21st-century Algerian women politicians
People from Algiers
20th-century Algerian politicians
Date of birth missing (living people)
21st-century Algerian politicians